The Southern Amazon Mosaic is a protected area mosaic in Brazil.

Creation
The Southern Amazon Mosaic  of conservation units in the region between the states of Amazonas, Mato Grosso and Rondônia was recognized by the federal environment ministry by ordnance 332 of 25 August 2011.
The mosaic was to have an advisory board as a forum for integrated management with representatives of the conservation units, the federal and state environmental agencies and civil society organisations.

Federal units

Under the administration of the Chico Mendes Institute for Biodiversity Conservation (ICMBio) it included:
 Juruena National Park
 Campos Amazônicos National Park
 Jaru Biological Reserve
 Jatuarana National Forest

Amazonas units

Under the administration of the Centro Estadual de Unidades de Conservação - CEUC (Amazonas):
Sucunduri State Park
Guariba State Park
Bararati Sustainable Development Reserve
Aripuanã Sustainable Development Reserve
Guariba Extractive Reserve
Manicoré State Forest
Aripuanã State Forest
Sucunduri State Forest
Apuí State Forest

Mato Grosso units

Under the administration of the Coordenação de Unidades de Conservação - CUCO (Mata Grosso):
Igarapés do Juruena State Park
Tucumã State Park
Apiacás Ecological Reserve
Rio Madeirinha Ecological Station
Rio Roosevelt Ecological Station
Guariba-Roosevelt Extractive Reserve

Rondônia units

Under the administration of the Secretaria de Estado do Desenvolvimento Ambiental de Rondônia - SEDAM (Rondônia):

Roxinho Extractive Reserve
Seringueira Extractive Reserve
Garrote Extractive Reserve
Mogno Extractive Reserve
Piquiá Extractive Reserve
Angelim Extractive Reserve
Itaúba Extractive Reserve
Ipê Extractive Reserve
Jatobá Extractive Reserve
Massaranduba Extractive Reserve
Maracatiara Extractive Reserve
Sucupira Extractive Reserve
Castanheira Extractive Reserve
Aquariquara Extractive Reserve
Freijó Extractive Reserve
Rio Preto/Jacundá Extractive Reserve
Cedro State Forest
Mutum State Forest
Gavião State Forest
Araras State Forest
Tucano State Forest

Notes

Sources

Protected area mosaics of Brazil
Protected areas of Amazonas (Brazilian state)
Protected areas of Mato Grosso
Protected areas of Rondônia